Sky Pool may refer to:

 Sky Pool, London
 Sky Pool, Houston